30 Degrees in February is a Swedish drama series produced for television, airing originally on the SVT network and distributed internationally on Netflix. The series was created by Anders Weidemann and produced by Håkan Hammarén at Fundament Film. The first season debuted on February 6, 2012 and the second season premiered on February 1, 2016 and was produced by Anagram in co-production with SVT and Film i Vast.

The series depicts the lives of various Swedish citizens who move to Thailand. The series was filmed on location in and around Phuket, with additional scenes filmed in Sweden. The series airs primarily in Swedish, with some scenes in English and Thai.

It was part of a feature at the 2016 Gothenburg Film Festival to highlight the increasing popularity of Scandinavian television series abroad. The first season won Swedish television awards (Kristallen) in 2012, including for best drama series. It also received an International Emmy Award nomination in 2013 in the Best Actress category, for Lotta Tejle, who plays Majlis.

Plot

Season 1 
The series weaves three separate stories of Swedes who embark on a new beginning in Thailand.

Kajsa (Maria Lundqvist) is a divorced workaholic who suffers a stroke and decides to move to Thailand with her daughters Joy and Wilda. They travel to a hotel on a remote beach where they had visited on holiday. Once they find it to be closed, Kajsa decide to buy it, but clashes with Chan the former owner who wants it back, while her daughter Joy falls in love with Chan's son Pong.

Majlis (Lotta Tejle) visits Thailand with her grumpy and verbally abusive wheelchair user husband, Bengt (Kjell Bergqvist). Although Majlis is enchanted by the place and wants to stay, her husband wants to leave.

Glenn (Kjell Wilhelmsen) is a lonely 45 year old blue collar worker who dreams of having a wife and children. After repeatedly being rejected by women in Sweden, he decides to search for a new wife in Thailand. His search is complicated when he meets the transgender masseuse Oh (Duangjai Phiao Hiransri).

Season 2 
Joy and Wilda's father travels from Sweden to search for them with the intention of bringing them back home. Majlis is on the run from the authorities, and Glenn and Oh struggle with whether they can have a future together.

Cast 
Kjell Bergqvist (Bengt)
Lotta Tejle (Majlis)
Maria Lundqvist (Kajsa)
Hanna Ardéhn (Joy)
Viola Weidemann (Wilda)
Thomas Chaanhing (Chan)
Sanong Sudla (Pong)
Kjell Wilhelmsen (Glenn)
DoungJai "Phiao" Hiransri (Oh)
Sumontha "Joom" Sounpoirarat (Dit)
Björn Bengtsson (Bengt Jr)
Torkel Petersson (Johnny)
Rebecka Hemse (Sara)
Björn Kjellman (Anders)
Linus Wahlgren (Johnny)
 Namfon Phetsut (Teng)

References

External links 
SVT official series website
 

2010s Swedish television series
Swedish drama television series
Television shows set in Sweden
Television shows set in Thailand
Transgender-related television shows
Swedish-language television shows